Calosoma nyassicus is a species of ground beetle in the subfamily of Carabinae. It have traverse prothorax with rounded sides which is also wrinkled like its head.

References

nyassicus
Beetles described in 1984
Endemic fauna of Malawi